Unendlich is a 2013 album by German popular singer Matthias Reim. The album had a long gestation of over two years.

Reim's 12th album signalled an unexpected - even for the singer - return to popularity. The long delayed album went immediately to No.1 on the German album charts, his first No.1 since his No.1 debut 23 years earlier.

Charts

Weekly charts

Year-end charts

References

2013 albums